Decatur County is a county located in the U.S. state of Iowa. As of the 2020 census, the population was 7,645. The county seat is Leon. This county is named for Stephen Decatur Jr., a hero in the War of 1812.

History
Decatur County was organized in 1850 and named for Stephen Decatur, a naval hero of the War of 1812.
The current courthouse was dedicated in 1908.

Geography

Major highways
 Interstate 35
 U.S. Highway 69
 Iowa Highway 2

Transit
 List of intercity bus stops in Iowa

Adjacent counties
Clarke County  (north)
Wayne County  (east)
Mercer County, Missouri  (southeast)
Harrison County, Missouri  (southwest)
Ringgold County  (west)

Demographics

2020 census
There were 3,653 housing units of which 2,986 were occupied.

2010 census
There were 3,834 housing units, of which 3,223 were occupied.

2000 census

At the 2000 census, there were 8,689 people, 3,337 households and 2,149 families residing in the county. The population density was 16 per square mile (6/km2). There were 3,833 housing units at an average density of 7 per square mile (3/km2). The racial makeup of the county was 96.46% White, 0.98% Black or African American, 0.24% Native American, 0.63% Asian, 0.12% Pacific Islander, 0.46% from other races, and 1.12% from two or more races.  1.70% of the population were Hispanic or Latino of any race.

There were 3,337 households, of which 28.00% had children under the age of 18 living with them, 54.30% were married couples living together, 7.20% had a female householder with no husband present, and 35.60% were non-families. 30.30% of all households were made up of individuals, and 15.50% had someone living alone who was 65 years of age or older.  The average household size was 2.37 and the average family size was 2.96.

23.00% of the population were under the age of 18, 16.30% from 18 to 24, 21.60% from 25 to 44, 21.50% from 45 to 64, and 17.70% who were 65 years of age or older. The median age was 36 years. For every 100 females there were 95.70 males. For every 100 females age 18 and over, there were 91.90 males.

The median household income was $27,343 and the median family income was $34,831. Males had a median income of $25,569 compared with  $19,309 for females. The per capita income for the county was $14,209. About 10.90% of families and 15.50% of the population were below the poverty line, including 15.60% of those under age 18 and 13.70% of those age 65 or over.

Decatur County is considered to be the poorest in Iowa, reporting that almost 20% of its residents live in poverty.

County officials
Supervisors 
Bob Bell 
Dan Christiansen 
Ward Graham

Treasurer 
Janet Pierson

Attorney
Lisa Hynden-Jeanes

Auditor 
Charlene Hoover

Recorder 
Gale Norman

Sheriff
Ben Boswell

Assessor 
Justin Cornett

Engineer 
Vacant

Clerk of Court 
Traci Tharp

Public Health Administrator 
Shelley Bickel

Veterans Affairs Administrator 
Samantha Schaff

Conservation Director 
Rich Erke

Mental Health Director 
Kathy Lerma

Communities

Cities

Davis City
Decatur City
Garden Grove
Grand River
Lamoni
Leon
Le Roy
Pleasanton
Van Wert
Weldon

Townships
Decatur County is divided into these townships:

 Bloomington
 Burrell
 Center
 Decatur
 Eden
 Fayette
 Franklin
 Garden Grove
 Grand River
 Hamilton
 High Point
 Long Creek
 Morgan
 New Buda
 Richland
 Woodland

Population ranking
The population ranking of the following table is based on the 2020 census of Decatur County.

† county seat

Politics

See also

Decatur County Courthouse (Iowa)
National Register of Historic Places listings in Decatur County, Iowa

References

External links

 

 
1846 establishments in Iowa Territory
Populated places established in 1846